Sheykh Ghayib''{ one of the elders of the Arab tribes of Bani Ka'b Karamullah(also Romanized as Sheykh Ghāyīb''') is a village in Ahudasht Rural District, Shavur District, Shush County, Khuzestan Province, Iran. At the 2006 census, its population was 193, in 26 families.

References 

Populated places in Shush County